Svenstrup is a town in Aalborg Municipality with a population of 7,650 (2022), Region Nordjylland in Denmark. It is located 10 km south of Aalborg's city centre and 3 km south of the southern outskirts of the city.

Svenstrup is served by Svenstrup railway station on the Randers–Aalborg railway line. The station re-opened in 2003.

The Battle of Svenstrup was fought during the Count's Feud in 1534 on the fields just outside Svenstrup.

Notable people 
 Jan Ø. Jørgensen (born 1987 in Svenstrup) a Danish badminton player previously number 1 on IBF world ranking
 Nicklas Helenius (born 1991 in Svenstrup) a Danish footballer, a striker for the Danish club AaB Fodbold

References 

Cities and towns in the North Jutland Region
Towns and settlements in Aalborg Municipality